Montresta is a comune (municipality) in the Province of Oristano in the Italian region Sardinia, located about  northwest of Cagliari and about  north of Oristano.

In 1746 about fifty Greek families of Maniot descent residing in Cargèse (Corsica) emigrated to Sardinia, where they obtained from Carlo Emanuele III territories in the area of the Villa of San Cristoforo di Montresta to establish their new settlement.  

Montresta borders the following municipalities: Bosa, Villanova Monteleone, Padria.

Demographic evolution

References

Cities and towns in Sardinia
1750 establishments in Italy
Greek diaspora in Europe
States and territories established in 1750
Populated places established in 1750